Chris Bettney (born 27 October 1977) is an English former professional footballer who plays for Rainworth Miners Welfare.

Born in Chesterfield, England, Bettney can also play up front and scored his first league goal for Harrogate Town with a volley against Farsley Celtic in a 1–0 home win on 7 February 2007. He added to his tally soon after with a free-kick away to Workington in Harrogate's 3–2 loss on 24 February 2007. In June 2008, he left Harrogate Town for Bradford Park Avenue. However, only six months later, he moved to Retford United, for whom he made his debut against Rushall Olympic.

References

External links

1977 births
Living people
Footballers from Chesterfield
English footballers
Association football midfielders
Sheffield United F.C. players
Hull City A.F.C. players
Chesterfield F.C. players
Rochdale A.F.C. players
Macclesfield Town F.C. players
Worksop Town F.C. players
Staveley Miners Welfare F.C. players
South Normanton Athletic F.C. players
Ilkeston Town F.C. (1945) players
Alfreton Town F.C. players
Harrogate Town A.F.C. players
Bradford (Park Avenue) A.F.C. players
Retford United F.C. players
English Football League players
Rainworth Miners Welfare F.C. players